Chater Plain is a Union Council (an administrative subdivision) of Mansehra District in Khyber-Pakhtunkhwa province of Pakistan. It is part of Mansehra Tehsil and is located in an area that was affected by the 2005 Kashmir earthquake.  Majority of the clans are Swati Pashtuns and Gujars. It is the highest plain point in the mountain regions starting from abbottabad to gilgit

References 

Union councils of Mansehra District